Farouk Ahmed Sayed (10 December 1970) is a former South Yemen athlete, who competed at the 1988 Summer Olympic Games in the men's 5000m, he finished 18th in his heat and failed to advance.

References

External links
 

1970 births
Living people
Yemeni male long-distance runners
Olympic athletes of South Yemen
Athletes (track and field) at the 1988 Summer Olympics
20th-century Yemeni people